Vriesea sucrei is a plant species in the genus Vriesea.

The bromeliad is endemic to the Atlantic Forest biome (Mata Atlantica Brasileira), located in southeastern Brazil.

Cultivars
 Vriesea 'Coppertone'
 Vriesea 'Pink Gusher'
 Vriesea 'Regent'
 Vriesea 'Sunset'
 Vriesea 'Sweet One'
 Vriesea 'Sweet Red'
 Vriesea 'Sweet Yellow'
 Vriesea 'Yara'

References

BSI Cultivar Registry Retrieved 11 October 2009

sucrei
Endemic flora of Brazil
Flora of the Atlantic Forest